Sssnake is a video game for the Atari 2600 produced by Data Age in 1982. Its gameplay is similar to Centipede, except the player moves in the center of the screen and fires towards the top, bottom and sides.

Reception
In 1991, Digital Press included the game on a list of the ten worst Atari 2600 games.

References

External links
Sssnake  at AtariAge
Sssnake at GameSpot

Atari 2600 games
Atari 2600-only games
1982 video games
Fixed shooters
Video game clones
Video games about reptiles
Video games developed in the United States
Multiplayer and single-player video games